The Vanšu Bridge in Riga is a cable-stayed bridge that crosses the Daugava river in Riga, the capital of Latvia. The word vanšu refers to the cables suspending its deck, comparing them to nautical rigging also known as shrouds in English; thus a direct translation of the name is Shroud Bridge. 595 meters in length, it is one of five bridges crossing the Daugava in Riga and passes over Ķīpsala island. It was built during the Soviet period and opened to public use on 21 July 1981 as the Gorky Bridge after Maxim Gorky street, today renamed Krišjānis Valdemārs street, which it extends across the river.

In the last decade there have been more than 10 instances of people attempting to climb the cables. The only one with lethal consequences was on June 7, 2012, when a man committed suicide by jumping down from the bridge's cables. After the incident Riga City Council ordered for barbed wire entanglements to be installed on the cables.

In 2013 a beach with a playground and volleyball field was opened next to the Vanšu bridge in Ķīpsala.

An extensive renovation project for the bridge is scheduled to begin in 2023.

Gallery

References 

Cable-stayed bridges in Latvia
Bridges in Riga
Crossings of the Daugava River
Bridges built in the Soviet Union
Bridges completed in 1981